Evergreen is the name of locations in the U.S. state of Wisconsin:

Evergreen, Langlade County, Wisconsin
Evergreen, Marathon County, Wisconsin
Evergreen, Washburn County, Wisconsin